Parthenos, the clippers, are a genus of butterflies found in Southeast Asia.

Species
Listed alphabetically:

References

External links
Images representing Parthenos at EOL
Images representing Parthenos at Bold

Limenitidinae
Nymphalidae genera
Taxa named by Jacob Hübner